This page documents notable tornadoes and tornado outbreaks worldwide in 2004. Strong and destructive tornadoes form most frequently in the United States, Bangladesh, and Eastern India, but they can occur almost anywhere under the right conditions. Tornadoes also develop occasionally in southern Canada during the Northern Hemisphere's summer and somewhat regularly at other times of the year across Europe, Asia, and Australia. Tornadic events are often accompanied with other forms of severe weather, including strong thunderstorms, strong winds, and hail.

The United States recorded more tornadoes during this year than any other year on record, with 1,817 touching down across the country.

Synopsis

United States yearly total

January
3 tornadoes were confirmed in the U.S.

February
9 tornadoes were confirmed in the U.S.

March
46 tornadoes were confirmed in the U.S.

March 4–5

On March 4, a large storm system produced 29 tornadoes across Texas into parts of Oklahoma. In addition to the tornadoes, heavy rain caused flooding in the Plains and an unusual derecho produced heavy damage, primarily in Texas.

March 27

April
125 tornadoes were confirmed in the U.S.

April 7 (Ukraine)
A strong F2 (possibly F3) tornado struck the towns of Velikaya Kostromka and Pervoye-Maya in Ukraine on April 7, killing one person and damaging or destroying 130 homes.

April 14 (Bangladesh)
A powerful tornado struck portions of North-Central Bangladesh, killing 111 and injuring nearly 1,500 others.

April 20

A powerful tornado struck the town of Utica, Illinois. It was part of an outbreak of 30 tornadoes that formed in eastern Iowa, northern Illinois, and northern Indiana in a short period of time. The Utica tornado caused the only fatalities. Another tornado struck the city of Joliet, Illinois, causing US$5 million in damage to the historic district in town.

April 21 (China)
Seven people were killed and 207 injured by a tornado that appeared on the evening of April 21 in Hengyang, Hunan, China. 700 farmers were left homeless by the tornado, according to China Daily.

May
509 tornadoes were confirmed in the U.S.

May 9 (China)
Two people were killed by a tornado in Huilai County, China. The tornado appeared shortly after noon, with wind speeds reaching up 49.4 m/s (110.5 mi/hr) and causing serious damage to several hundred homes.

May 12

A massive and nighttime high-end F4 tornado passed near the town of Harper, Kansas. The rating, however, is a source of controversy. At peak intensity, it severely scoured the ground, completely erasing a two-story farmhouse, sweeping clean the top of the basement walls in the process, and debarking nearby trees. Vehicles were torn apart and thrown long distances. The reason for the F4 rating was that the tornado was very slow-moving, which may have added to the extent of the damage.

May 22–30

The F4 tornado caused one death and 37 injuries in the city of Hallam. It was later surpassed by a massive 2.6 mile (4.2 km) twister that struck El Reno, on May 31, 2013. That tornado killed 8 people, including 4 storm chasers.

Beginning on May 29, after the Storm Prediction Center issued a high risk for severe weather, 149 tornadoes were confirmed in 32 hours, killing five people. The Memorial Day Weekend outbreak is considered to be one of the most prolific in US history in terms of the number of tornadoes.

June
268 tornadoes were confirmed in the U.S.

June 1 (Russia)
One June 1, at least 11 tornadoes touched down in Russia, including a high-end F3 that damaged or destroyed 342 homes.

June 9 (Europe)

Several tornadoes touched down across northern Germany, the Czech Republic, and Hungary on June 9. At 14:30 UTC, an F3 tornado struck Litovel, injuring five people. A T4/F2 tornado injured one person in Lower Saxony, and another F2 tornado struck Budapest.

June 11–12
A small tornado outbreak began across the Midwestern United States on June 11, mainly in Iowa and Wisconsin. Most of the tornadoes that occurred this day were weak, being rated F0 or F1. However, a few strong tornadoes did touch down, the most significant being an F3 tornado that caused deep ground scouring and destroyed a home near Le Roy, Minnesota. The next day would bring more tornadoes, this time to Kansas. The first tornado was reported near Belle Plaine, which was rated F0. After the first tornado lifted, the same supercell produced another tornado, which would go on to impact structures near Mulvane. This tornado directly hit a house and completely removed it from its foundation. After the Mulvane tornado dissipated, another photogenic tornado touched down near Rock and was rated F0. This supercell would go on to produce several more tornadoes, all of which were rated F0. Overall, 46 tornadoes touched down during this outbreak.

June 18 (Russia)
On June 18, another F3 tornado touched down in Russia, injuring seven people.

June 23 (Germany)

A severe F3 tornado hit the Saxony-Anhaltian villages of Micheln and Trebbichau. Both villages have suffered from damages.

June 23 (Wisconsin) 
On June 23, two large F3 tornadoes hit the county of Green Lake.

July
124 tornadoes were confirmed in the U.S.

July 7–9 (Europe)

In Poland, a tornado touched down in Wiktorów and Borzęcin near Warsaw. 21 houses were damaged. One 36-year-old man lost his life after he was lifted off the ground by the tornado. An F2 tornado struck Jelonka and Kleszczele near Dubicze Cerkiewne, Podlaskie Voivodeship. 200 buildings were damaged. Skywarn Polska

July 13–15

On July 13, a large, violent F4 tornado struck Roanoke, Illinois, destroying the Pearson Manufacturing Plant and some civilian residences. Despite the extensive damage along its 9.6 mile path of destruction, well advance warning of the storm's approach led to only a few minor injuries and no fatalities. Three other F0 tornadoes were confirmed on this day as well.

On July 14, a large storm system passed over the Northeastern United States. It produced several severe storms, and numerous tornadoes. The worst destruction was in Campbelltown, Pennsylvania, where 272 properties were damaged or destroyed by an F3 tornado that struck the town around 3:00 PM.

July 18
On July 18, a small tornado outbreak struck North Dakota. The most powerful tornado was a high-end F4 that struck the town of Marion. Though there were no fatalities or injuries, this tornado is considered to be one of the strongest tornadoes of the 2000s.

August
179 tornadoes were confirmed in the U.S., setting a new record high for August.

August 11 (France)
On August 11, a waterspout moved onshore in Houat, France, damaging the harbor and village. One person was killed after being lifted off the ground by the tornado and falling on rocks while twelve others were injured.

August 12

The second storm of the 2004 Atlantic hurricane season, Tropical Storm Bonnie caused minor damage while spawning several tornadoes when it made landfall several hours before Hurricane Charley. It spawned a tornado in Pender County, North Carolina, killing 3 and causing $1.27 million in damage. An F0 tornado also moved through Northwestern Jacksonville.

August 13–14

Hurricane Charley caused major damage along the Florida coast and the Mid-Atlantic while spawning several tornadoes including an F2 storm.

September
Exceptional tornado activity took place in the month of September, with 297 tornadoes confirmed in the U.S. This set a monthly record for September, and more than doubled the previous record of 139 set in 1967. This mainly had to do with three very large outbreaks directly tied to tropical cyclones during the 2004 Atlantic Hurricane Season.

September 4–8

Hurricane Frances produced the third highest number of tornadoes spawned by a single tropical cyclone. At the time of the outbreak, it was the second highest but was surpassed by Hurricane Ivan later that month.

September 15–18

Hurricane Ivan produced the highest number of tornadoes from a single tropical cyclone on record. During the storm's 3.5 day outbreak, 120 tornadoes touched down over eight states. The outbreak killed nine people, six of which were in Florida and four were from a single tornado.

September 25–28

Hurricane Jeanne was the final hurricane to strike the U.S. during the 2004 Atlantic hurricane season. It spawned several tornadoes upon and after its landfall. An F2 tornado killed one person and injured thirteen north of Ridgeway, South Carolina on September 27.

October
79 tornadoes were confirmed in the U.S.

October 18–19

For these two days, a series of 49 tornadoes struck 28 counties in the U.S. across 6 states (Arkansas, Missouri, Alabama, Tennessee, Kentucky, and Illinois). One F2 tornado in Saline County, Arkansas resulted in 11 injuries and another F2 in Pemiscot County, Missouri resulted in 3 deaths and 7 injuries. A total of 3 deaths and 30 injuries were reported for this two-day outbreak.

November
150 tornadoes were confirmed in the U.S.

November 12–13 (Italy and Tunisia)

Several powerful tornadoes struck southern Sicily and northern Tunisia on November 12 and 13. The strongest was a high-end F3 multiple-vortex tornado that touched down near Scicli on November 12 which inflicted roughly €25 million (US$32.4 million) in damage. Another tornado, rated F2, began just offshore Donnalucata before moving inland. The following day, a long-tracked F2 tornado struck several towns in northern Tunisia, most notably Kelibia, El Haouaria, and Hammamet, killing 9–12 people and injuring 60–73 others. Three homes were completely destroyed by the tornado while many others sustained varying degrees of damage. Significant agricultural damage as well as loss of livestock also resulted from the storm. A third F2 touched down near Rakkada and injured 21 people. In light of the damage in Tunisia, the Tunisian Red Crescent society assisted approximately 200 affected persons with recovery funds and supplies.

November 22–24

In late November, a significant three-day outbreak of tornadoes took place across the Southern United States. The outbreak began on the 22nd, producing six F0 tornadoes in Louisiana and Texas, three of which occurred in the Houston area. The tornadoes caused minimal damage and no injuries.

Tornado activity continued in the same general area on the 23rd. Early on, most of the touchdowns were weak, though an F2 tornado near Kountze, Texas damaged between 10 and 20 houses and killed a woman when trees crushed her mobile home. Several other tornadoes occurred in Texas throughout the afternoon, and soon began touch down in Louisiana as well. An F2 struck the town of Hutton, damaging about 15 houses and injuring three people. Further north, an F3 touched down and ripped directly through the town of Olla, where major damage occurred. A high school in town sustained significant damage, along with 106 homes. Some of the homes only had interior rooms left. A pickup truck outside of town was thrown 200 feet, and in the nearby town of Standard, four homes and a store were destroyed. Overall, the tornado killed one person and injured 20 others. Another F3 touched down near Fayette, Mississippi, destroying a steel-frame shed, damaging several homes, and flattening large swaths of trees.

Vigorous tornado activity continued on the 24th, mainly across Mississippi and Alabama. However, an F2 tornado tore through the northwest side of Slidell, Louisiana, damaging 152 homes in a single subdivision and injuring four people. Numerous tornadoes touched down in Mississippi, with the strongest being an F3 that passed near Noxapater. The tornado downed hundreds of trees, tossed vehicles, and destroyed chicken houses. A house was completely destroyed, resulting in a fatality and two injuries. In Alabama, a large F2 tracked across Autauga, Chilton, and Coosa Counties. The tornado struck the Cooper community, resulting in major structural damage. Another F2 touched down and struck the Talladega Superspeedway, where two concession stands within the infield area of the race track had their roofs blown off. The Bush Garage area received building damage and the garage doors were bowed out. Debris was scattered between the garage area and Victory Lane. One digital leader board was completely destroyed and another one sustained major damage. The tornado continued east through Eastaboga, where two homes suffered major roof damage, two porches were destroyed and many trees were blown down. The tornado then struck Bynum where downed trees heavily damaged two mobile homes, with a 75-year-old woman being killed in one of them. The tornado then caused roof and structural damage in Southern Anniston before dissipating. Overall, the outbreak produced 104 tornadoes and killed four people.

December
26 tornadoes were confirmed in the U.S.

December 6–7

A small tornado outbreak took place in the Deep South on the evening of December 6 and early on the 7th.

December 22 
This was the last tornado outbreak of 2004, with 16 tornadoes reported.

December 29  
3 tornadoes were reported in California.

See also
 Weather of 2004
 Tornado
 Tornadoes by year
 Tornado records
 Tornado climatology
 Tornado myths
 List of tornado outbreaks
 List of F5 and EF5 tornadoes
 List of F4 and EF4 tornadoes
 List of North American tornadoes and tornado outbreaks
 List of 21st-century Canadian tornadoes and tornado outbreaks
 List of European tornadoes and tornado outbreaks
 List of tornadoes and tornado outbreaks in Asia
 List of Southern Hemisphere tornadoes and tornado outbreaks
 List of tornadoes striking downtown areas
 List of tornadoes with confirmed satellite tornadoes
 Tornado intensity
 Fujita scale
 Enhanced Fujita scale
 International Fujita scale
 TORRO scale

References
General

Specific

External links 
 Monthly Tornado Stats (SPC)
 Annual Severe Weather Report Summary 2004 (SPC)
 Tornado project tornadoes of 2004
 Storm Data "2004 Annual Summaries" (NCDC)

 
2004 meteorology
Tornado-related lists by year
2004-related lists